Ronen Eldan is an Israeli mathematician. Eldan is a professor at the Weizmann Institute of Science working on probability theory, mathematical analysis, theoretical computer science and the theory of machine learning. He received the 2018 Erdős Prize, the 2022 Blavatnik Award for Young Scientists and was a speaker at the 2022 International Congress of Mathematicians.

Selected works 

 
 
 
 Sébastien Bubeck, Ronen Eldan: “Multi-scale exploration of convex functions and bandit convex optimization”, 2015; arXiv:1507.06580.
 Sébastien Bubeck, Ronen Eldan, Yin Tat Lee: “Kernel-based methods for bandit convex optimization”, 2016; arXiv:1607.03084.

Awards 
 Haim Nessyahu Prize for Mathematics (2013)
 Erdős Prize in Mathematics (2018)
 Blavatnik Award for Young Scientists (2022)
 New Horizons Breakthrough Prize in Mathematics (2023)

References 

1980 births
Living people
Tel Aviv University alumni
University of Washington alumni
Academic staff of Weizmann Institute of Science
Israeli scientists
Jewish scientists
Israeli mathematicians
Erdős Prize recipients